Gopala III, previously known as Gopala II, (reigned 940–960 CE) was the successor to the Pala king Rajyapala in the Bengal region of the Indian subcontinent, and ninth ruler of the Pala line reigning for 20 years. He was succeeded by Vigrahapala II.

Life
He was the son of Rajyapala by the Rashtrakuta princess Bhagyadevi, who may be identified as a daughter of Jagattunga, himself a son of Emperor Krishna II.

During Gopala's reign, the Chandelas and Kalachuris of Tripuri emerged in lands formerly of the Pratiharas. The Kamboja tribes also established themselves in the North of Bengal, pushing Gopala to southern Bihar and western Bengal. He was a weak ruler, like all the late Pala rulers. The Pala territory greatly reduced during his reign.

See also
List of rulers of Bengal

References

Year of birth missing
960 deaths
Pala kings